Gora Chakk Wala, also spelled as Gora Chakwala, is a noted Punjabi singer-songwriter belongs to Bathinda district (Malwa region) of Punjab, India.

Early life

Gora was born as Gurpreet pal to father Late Shri Ram Gopal  and mother Late Jamuna Devi in the village of Chakk Fateh Singh Wala of Bathinda district in Indian Punjab. He got his primary education from the village, passed senior secondary from Khalsa Senior Secondary School, Bathinda and done his graduation from Meera musical collage of Bathinda.

Career

His first song was recorded in Balkar Sidhu's album while he was doing his graduation. As a songwriter, he inspired from his elder brother Jagga Chakk Wala and learn more about songwriting from his Guru (Teacher), Jasveer Viyogi and learned music from Kuldeep Manak and entered the world of Punjabi music with his album Galian Udaas Ho Gayian that, encouraging him, did very well. His second album, Tera Dil Marzi Da Malik, made him star overnight. As per trend, he also released some duet albums with singer, Sudesh Kumari and Miss Pooja. He went to many countries such as- Canada, USA, UK, New Zealand, and Hong Kong for live events. He is now a successful and established singer but the university gold medalist never felt overproud of his success. Till now, he has released more than one and a half dozen albums.

Discography

 Galian Udas Ho Gayian
 Tera Dil Marzi Da Malik
 Jaano Maar Zaalman
 Chandri Ron Lagg Pai
 Gall Tarhke Karange
 Gallan Teriyan Te Meriyan
 Chhad Paap Nekiyan Kar Lai (Religious)
 Sikhi Di Kahani (Religious)
 Din Kiven Gujarenga
 The Musical Tour
 Khuskhabri
 Dhokha(The Ditch)
 Gora Chakwala Live Vol 1
 Yaar te pyar
 Tour 2
 Tere Dite Dukh Sajjana
 Kive Aa Gayi Sadi Yaad
 Vichhode Wali Satt
 Akhara Gora Chak Wala
 Tera Rusna Manauna
 Dhol Vajda (Various Artists)
 Tenu Ki Khabaran(Various Artists)
 Koke Da Lishkara(Various Artists)
 Hun Tere Din Channiye
 Gall Mukdi Muka Le
 Sohna Tera Dar(Religious)
 Maiya Da Deedaar(Religious)
 Duet Masti (No.1)
 Jinde (Various Artists)
 Sangeet-2005 ( Various Artists)
 Pingh Latak Di Reh gayi (Gora Chak Wala and Balkaar Sidhu)
 Akhiyan (Various Artists)
 Wifi (Single Track)
 Baliye Sohniye (Various Artists)
 Punjabi shonk (Various Artists)
 Black Money(Duet Single Track)
 Swaal (Single Track)
 Dhiyaan De Maape (Single Track)
 Heart ( Single Track)

References

Punjabi-language singers
Punjabi people
1974 births
Living people